Changqing Road is an interchange station on Lines 7 and 13 of the Shanghai Metro. It opened on 5 December 2009 as a Line 7 station. With the opening of phases two and three of Line 13 on 30 December 2018, it became a virtual interchange station between Lines 7 and 13. Passengers who hold the Shanghai Public Transportation Card and transfer within 30 minutes of exiting the station are able to transfer here to continue their journey.

The station is located near the junction of Changqing Road and Yaohua Road, just outside the Shanghai Expo 2010 zone.

Station Layout

References 

Railway stations in Shanghai
Line 7, Shanghai Metro
Line 13, Shanghai Metro
Shanghai Metro stations in Pudong
Railway stations in China opened in 2009